The gada (Sanskrit: गदा gadā, Kannada: ಗದೆ, Telugu: గద, Tamil: கதை, Malay: gedak, Old Tagalog: batuta) is a mallet or blunt mace from the Indian subcontinent. Made either of wood or metal, it consists essentially of a spherical head mounted on a shaft, with a spike on the top. Outside India, the gada was also adopted in Southeast Asia, where it is still used in silat. The weapon might have Indo-Iranian origins as Old Persian also uses the word gadā to mean club; see for example the etymology of Pasargadae.

The gada is the main weapon of the Hindu God Hanuman. Known for his strength, Hanuman is traditionally worshipped by wrestlers in the Indian subcontinent and Southeast Asia. Vishnu also carries a gada named Kaumodaki in one of his four hands. In the epic Mahabharata, the fighters Balarama, Bhima, Duryodhana, Jarasandha and others were said to be masters of the gada.

Gada-yuddha

The martial art of wielding the gada is known as gada-yuddha. It can either be wielded singly or in pairs, and can be handled in twenty different ways.

Exercise equipment
Maces of various weights and heights are used depending on the strength and skill level of the practitioner. It is believed that Lord Hanuman's gada was the largest amongst all the gadas in the world. For training purposes, one or two wooden gada are swung behind the back in several different ways and is particularly useful for building grip strength and shoulder endurance. The Great Gama was known for extensive use of gada. Winners in a kushti contest are often awarded with a gada.

The war mallets were also inspired by gada.

In Southeast Asia 
Gada has also been adopted by practitioners of silat martial arts in the Malay World. In Indonesia the word "gada" has broadened to refer to any impact weapons that are not a simple club, like mace, morning star, and flail. However, several ethnic groups of Indonesia have their own version of gada. Traditional Indonesian gada generally shaped more like Persian meel club than Indian gada. This is because the iron used to make gada in pre-modern Indonesia, called besi khurasani, was imported from Khorasan. Local gada is often coated in an alloy called besi kuning, which is believed to possess magical power.

See also
Mace (bludgeon)

References

Weapons in Hindu mythology
Indian melee weapons
Weapons of India
Clubs (weapon)